The MŽ class 411 is an electric multiple unit built for Makedonski Železnici by CRRC Zhuzhou Locomotive.

History
Two three-car Class 411 EMUs have been built by CRRC under a contract signed in June 2014. The railway announced in June 2019 that the units have had electrical problems, which the manufacturer refuses to fix under warranty. There have also been issues with procuring spare parts, as the costs of shipping the items from China exceed the value of the parts themselves 

The units were financed in part with a €25 million loan from the European Bank for Reconstruction & Development.

Technical specifications

Voltage 
This train set utilises 25 kV/50 Hz AC.

References

Electric multiple units of North Macedonia
CRRC multiple units
25 kV AC multiple units